Small Form-factor Pluggable (SFP) is a compact, hot-pluggable network interface module format used for both telecommunication and data communications applications. An SFP interface on networking hardware is a modular slot for a media-specific transceiver, such as for a fiber-optic cable or a copper cable. The advantage of using SFPs compared to fixed interfaces (e.g. modular connectors in Ethernet switches) is that individual ports can be equipped with different types of transceivers as required.

The form factor and electrical interface are specified by a multi-source agreement (MSA) under the auspices of the Small Form Factor Committee. The SFP replaced the larger gigabit interface converter (GBIC) in most applications, and has been referred to as a Mini-GBIC by some vendors.

SFP transceivers exist supporting synchronous optical networking (SONET), Gigabit Ethernet, Fibre Channel, PON, and other communications standards. At introduction, typical speeds were 1 Gbit/s for Ethernet SFPs and up to 4 Gbit/s for Fibre Channel SFP modules. In 2006, SFP+ specification brought speeds up to 10 Gbit/s and the SFP28 iteration is designed for speeds of 25 Gbit/s.

A slightly larger sibling is the four-lane Quad Small Form-factor Pluggable (QSFP). The additional lanes allow for speeds 4 times their corresponding SFP.  In 2014, the QSFP28 variant was published allowing speeds up to 100 Gbit/s. In 2019, the closely related QSFP56 was standardized doubling the top speeds to 200 Gbit/s with products already selling from major vendors. There are inexpensive adapters allowing SFP transceivers to be placed in a QSFP port.

Both a SFP-DD, which allows for 100 Gbit/s over two lanes, as well as a QSFP-DD specifications, which allows for 400 Gbit/s over eight lanes, have been published. These use a form factor which is directly backward compatible to their respective predecessors.

An alternative competing solution, the OSFP (Octal Small Format Pluggable) has products being released in 2022 capable of 800 Gbit/s links between network equipment. It is a slightly larger version than the QSFP form factor allowing for larger power outputs. The OSFP standard was initially announced in 2016 with the 4.0 version released in 2021 allowing for 800 Gbit/s via 8×100 Gbit/s electrical data lanes. Its proponents say a low-cost adapter will allow for backwards compatibility with QSFP modules.

SFP types
SFP transceivers are available with a variety of transmitter and receiver specifications, allowing users to select the appropriate transceiver for each link to provide the required optical or electrical reach over the available media type (e.g. twisted pair or twinaxial copper cables, multi-mode or single-mode fiber cables). Transceivers are also designated by their transmission speed. SFP modules are commonly available in several different categories.

Note that the QSFP/QSFP+/QSFP28/QSFP56 are designed to be electrically backwards compatible with SFP/SFP+/SFP28 or SFP56 respectively. Using a simple adapter or a special direct attached cable it is possible to connect those interfaces together using just one lane instead of four provided by the QSFP/QSFP+/QSFP28/QSFP56 form factor. The same applies to the QSFP-DD form factor with 8 lanes which can work downgraded to 4/2/1 lanes.

100 Mbit/s SFP 

 SX850 nm, for a maximum of 550 m 
 Multi-mode fiber, LC connector, with  color coding
 FX  1300 nm, for a distance up to 5 km. 
 LFX  (name dependent on manufacturer)1310 nm, for a distance up to 5 km.
 Single-mode fiber, LC connector, with  color coding
 LX1310 nm, for distances up to 10 km 
 EX1310 nm, for distances up to 40 km
 Single-mode fiber, LC connector, with  color coding
 ZX1550 nm, for distances up to 80 km, (depending on fiber path loss)
 EZX1550 nm, for distances up to 160 km (depending on fiber path loss)
 BX (officially BX10)1550 nm/1310 nm, Single Fiber Bi-Directional 100 Mbit SFP Transceivers, paired as BX-U and BX-D for uplink and downlink respectively, also for distances up to 10 km. Variations of bidirectional SFPs are also manufactured which higher transmit power versions with link length capabilities up to 40 km.
 Copper twisted-pair cabling, 8P8C (RJ-45) connector
 100BASE-TX for distances up to 100m.

1 Gbit/s SFP 

 1 Gbit/s multi-mode fiber, LC connector, with black or beige extraction lever
 SX850 nm, for a maximum of 550 m at 1.25 Gbit/s (gigabit Ethernet). Other multi-mode SFP applications support even higher rates at shorter distances.
 1.25 Gbit/s multi-mode fiber, LC connector, extraction lever colors not standardised
 SX+/MX/LSX  (name dependent on manufacturer)1310 nm, for a distance up to 2 km. Not compatible with SX or 100BASE-FX. Based on LX but engineered to work with a multi-mode fiber using a standard multi-mode patch cable rather than a mode-conditioning cable commonly used to adapt LX to multi-mode.
 1 to 2.5 Gbit/s single-mode fiber, LC connector, with blue extraction lever
 LX1310 nm, for distances up to 10 km (originally, LX just covered 5 km and LX10 for 10 km followed later)
 EX1310 nm, for distances up to 40 km 
 ZX1550 nm, for distances up to 80 km (depending on fiber path loss), with green extraction lever (see GLC-ZX-SM1)
 EZX1550 nm, for distances up to 160 km (depending on fiber path loss)
 BX (officially BX10)1490 nm/1310 nm, Single Fiber Bi-Directional Gigabit SFP Transceivers, paired as BX-U and BX-D for uplink and downlink respectively, also for distances up to 10 km.  Variations of bidirectional SFPs are also manufactured which use 1550 nm in one direction, and higher transmit power versions with link length capabilities up to 80 km.
 1550 nm 40 km (XD), 80 km (ZX), 120 km (EX or EZX)
 SFSWsingle-fiber single-wavelength transceivers, for bi-directional traffic on a single fiber. Coupled with CWDM, these double the traffic density of fiber links.
 Coarse wavelength-division multiplexing (CWDM) and dense wavelength-division multiplexing (DWDM) transceivers at various wavelengths achieving various maximum distances. CWDM and DWDM transceivers usually support link distances of 40 km, 80 km and 120 km.
 1 Gbit/s for copper twisted-pair cabling, 8P8C (RJ-45) connector
 1000BASE-Tthese modules incorporate significant interface circuitry for Physical Coding Sublayer recoding and can be used only for gigabit Ethernet because of the specific line code. They are not compatible with (or rather: do not have equivalents for) Fibre Channel or SONET. Unlike non-SFP, copper 1000BASE-T ports integrated into most routers and switches, 1000BASE-T SFPs usually cannot operate at 100BASE-TX speeds.
 100 Mbit/s copper and opticalsome vendors have shipped 100 Mbit/s limited SFPs for fiber-to-the-home applications and drop-in replacement of legacy 100BASE-FX circuits. These are relatively uncommon and can be easily confused with 100 Mbit/s SFPs.
 Although it is not mentioned in any official specification document the maximum data rate of the original SFP standard is 5 Gbit/s.  This was eventually used by both 4GFC Fibre Channel and the DDR Infiniband especially in its four lane QSFP form.
In recent years, SFP transceivers have been created that will allow 2.5 Gbit/s and 5 Gbit/s Ethernet speeds with SFPs with 2.5GBASE-T and 5GBASE-T.

10 Gbit/s SFP+

The SFP+ (enhanced small form-factor pluggable) is an enhanced version of the SFP that supports data rates up to 16 Gbit/s. The SFP+ specification was first published on May 9, 2006, and version 4.1 published on July 6, 2009. SFP+ supports 8 Gbit/s Fibre Channel, 10 Gigabit Ethernet and Optical Transport Network standard OTU2. It is a popular industry format supported by many network component vendors. Although the SFP+ standard does not include mention of 16 Gbit/s Fibre Channel, it can be used at this speed. Besides the data rate, the major difference between 8 and 16 Gbit/s Fibre Channel is the encoding method. 64b/66b encoding used for "16 Gbit/s" is a more efficient encoding mechanism than 8b/10b used for 8 Gbit/s, and allows for the data rate to double without doubling the line rate.  16GFC doesn't really use 16 Gbit/s signaling anywhere. It uses a 14.025 Gbit/s line rate to achieve twice the throughput of 8GFC.

SFP+ also introduces direct attach for connecting two SFP+ ports without dedicated transceivers. Direct attach cables (DAC) exist in passive (up to 7 m), active (up to 15 m), and active optical (AOC, up to 100 m) variants.

10 Gbit/s SFP+ modules are exactly the same dimensions as regular SFPs, allowing the equipment manufacturer to re-use existing physical designs for 24 and 48-port switches and modular line cards. In comparison to earlier XENPAK or XFP modules, SFP+ modules leave more circuitry to be implemented on the host board instead of inside the module. Through the use of an active electronic adapter, SFP+ modules may be used in older equipment with XENPAK ports  and X2 ports.

SFP+ modules can be described as limiting or linear types; this describes the functionality of the inbuilt electronics. Limiting SFP+ modules include a signal amplifier to re-shape the (degraded) received signal whereas linear ones do not. Linear modules are mainly used with the low bandwidth standards such as 10GBASE-LRM; otherwise, limiting modules are preferred.

25 Gbit/s SFP28 
SFP28 is a 25 Gbit/s interface which evolved from the 100 Gigabit Ethernet interface which is typically implemented with 4 by 25 Gbit/s data lanes. Identical in mechanical dimensions to SFP and SFP+, SFP28 implements one 28 Gbit/s lane accommodating 25 Gbit/s of data with encoding overhead.

SFP28 modules exist supporting single- or multi-mode fiber connections, active optical cable and direct attach copper.

cSFP
The compact small form-factor pluggable (cSFP) is a version of SFP with the same mechanical form factor allowing two independent bidirectional channels per port. It is used primarily to increase port density and decrease fiber usage per port.

SFP-DD
The small form-factor pluggable double density (SFP-DD) multi source agreement is a standard published in 2019 for doubling port density. According to the SFD-DD MSA website: "Network equipment based on the SFP-DD will support legacy SFP modules and cables, and new double density products."
SFP-DD uses two lanes to transmit.

Currently the following speeds are supported:
 SFP-DD: 100Gbit/s using PAM4 and 50Gbit/s using NRZ
 SFP-DD112: 200Gbit/s using PAM4
 QSFP-DD: / (8 ×  and 8 × )
 QSFP-DD112:  (8 × )

QSFP 

Quad Small Form-factor Pluggable (QSFP) transceivers are available with a variety of transmitter and receiver types, allowing users to select the appropriate transceiver for each link to provide the required optical reach over multi-mode or single-mode fiber.

 4 Gbit/s :The original QSFP document specified four channels carrying Gigabit Ethernet, 4GFC (FiberChannel), or DDR InfiniBand.
 40 Gbit/s (QSFP+) QSFP+ is an evolution of QSFP to support four 10 Gbit/s channels carrying 10 Gigabit Ethernet, 10GFC FiberChannel, or QDR InfiniBand.  The 4 channels can also be combined into a single 40 Gigabit Ethernet link.
 50 Gbit/s (QSFP14) The QSFP14 standard is designed to carry FDR InfiniBand, SAS-3. or 16G Fibre Channel
 100 Gbit/s (QSFP28) The QSFP28 standard  is designed to carry 100 Gigabit Ethernet, EDR InfiniBand, or 32G Fibre Channel. Sometimes this transceiver type is also referred to as "QSFP100" or "100G QSFP" for sake of simplicity.
 200 Gbit/s (QSFP56) QSFP56 is designed to carry 200 Gigabit Ethernet, HDR InfiniBand, or 64G Fibre Channel. The biggest enhancement is that QSFP56 uses four-level pulse-amplitude modulation (PAM-4) instead of non-return-to-zero (NRZ). It uses the same physical specifications as QSFP28 (SFF-8665), with electrical specifications from SFF-8024 and revision 2.10a of SFF-8636.   Sometimes this transceiver type is referred to as "200G QSFP" for sake of simplicity.

Switch and router manufacturers implementing QSFP+ ports in their products frequently allow for the use of a single QSFP+ port as four independent 10 gigabit ethernet connections, greatly increasing port density. For example, a typical 24-port QSFP+ 1U switch would be able to service 96x10GbE connections. There also exist fanout cables to adapt a single QSFP28 port to four independent 25 gigabit ethernet SFP28 ports (QSFP28-to-4×SFP28) as well as cables to adapt a single QSFP56 port to four independent 50 gigabit ethernet SFP56 ports (QSFP56-to-4×SFP56).

Applications

SFP sockets are found in Ethernet switches, routers, firewalls and network interface cards. They are used in Fibre Channel host adapters and storage equipment. Because of their low cost, low profile, and ability to provide a connection to different types of optical fiber, SFP provides such equipment with enhanced flexibility.

Standardization
The SFP transceiver is not standardized by any official standards body, but rather is specified by a multi-source agreement (MSA) among competing manufacturers. The SFP was designed after the GBIC interface, and allows greater port density (number of transceivers per given area) than the GBIC, which is why SFP is also known as mini-GBIC.

However, as a practical matter, some networking equipment manufacturers engage in vendor lock-in practices whereby they deliberately break compatibility with "generic" SFPs by adding a check in the device's firmware that will enable only the vendor's own modules. Third-party SFP manufacturers have introduced SFPs with EEPROMs which may be programmed to match any vendor ID.

Color coding of SFP

Color coding of SFP

Color coding of CWDM SFP

Color coding of BiDi SFP

Color coding of QSFP

Signals

SFP transceivers are 'right-handed': From their perspective, they transmit on the right and receive on the left. When looking into the optical connectors, transmission comes from the left and reception is on the right.

The SFP transceiver contains a printed circuit board with an edge connector with 20 pads that mate on the rear with the SFP electrical connector in the host system. The QSFP has 38 pads including 4 high-speed transmit data pairs and 4 high-speed receive data pairs.

Mechanical dimensions

The physical dimensions of the SFP transceiver (and its subsequent faster variants) are narrower than the later QSFP counterparts, which allows for SFP transceivers to be placed in QSFP ports via an inexpensive adapter.  Both are smaller than the XFP transceiver.

EEPROM information

The SFP MSA defines a 256-byte memory map into an EEPROM describing the transceiver's capabilities, standard interfaces, manufacturer, and other information, which is accessible over a serial I²C interface at the 8-bit address 0b1010000X (0xA0).

Digital diagnostics monitoring

Modern optical SFP transceivers support standard digital diagnostics monitoring (DDM) functions. This feature is also known as digital optical monitoring (DOM). This capability allows monitoring of the SFP operating parameters in real time. Parameters include optical output power, optical input power, temperature, laser bias current, and transceiver supply voltage. In network equipment, this information is typically made available via Simple Network Management Protocol (SNMP). A DDM interface allows end users to display diagnostics data and alarms for optical fiber transceivers and can be used to diagnose why a transceiver is not working.

See also
 Interconnect bottleneck
 Optical communication
 Parallel optical interface

References

External links 

 SNIA SFF Technology Affiliate Technical Work Group

Hot-swappable transceiver
Ethernet